Fay-ye Sofla (also Romanized as Fāy-ye Soflá; also known as Fā-ye Pā’īn, Fā-ye Soflá, and Nāy-e Soflá) is a village in Julaki Rural District, Jayezan District, Omidiyeh County, Khuzestan Province, Iran. At the 2006 census, its population was 40, in 5 families.

References 

Populated places in Omidiyeh County